Triple H (born 1969) is the ring name of Paul Michael Levesque, also known as Hunter Hearst Helmsley, an American business executive, professional wrestler, actor, and former bodybuilder.

Triple H may also refer to:

People, persons, characters
 Hans-Hermann Hoppe (born 1949, nicknamed Triple H), German-American professor and political activist

 Triple H, a fictional idol trio in the anime series Penguindrum

Groups, companies, organizations
 Triple H (band), a South Korean K-pop trio
 Triple H (Sydney), a community radio station based in Hornsby, New South Wales
 Triple H (Horsham), a community radio station based in Horsham, Victoria
 Triple H Team Hegersport, a German auto racing team

Other uses
 Triple H, a protocol for treating subarachnoid hemorrhage by inducing hypertension, hypervolemia, and hemodilution
 Triple H syndrome, a urea-cycle disorder

See also

 HHH (disambiguation)
 3H (disambiguation)
 H3 (disambiguation)